"Take Me" is a single by American nu metal band Korn, from their studio album, The Serenity of Suffering. It peaked at number 2 on the Billboard Mainstream Rock Songs chart in April 2017.

Background
The song was first released for streaming on October 11, 2016, two weeks ahead of the release of its respective album, The Serenity of Suffering. It was the second single released from the album, after "Rotting in Vain". The song was originally written by Davis for his then in the works debut solo album, but after handing it to Munky and Head, the song was re-worked into a Korn song.

Themes and composition
The song's lyrics are about addiction, specifically substance abuse. According to the song's writer, frontman Jonathan Davis, the song is actually written from the perspective of the drug itself, being inspired by Brad Paisley's personification of alcohol in his 2005 single "Alcohol", and other older country music songs that touched on the subject. Loudwire interpreted the song's sound and structure to represent the effects of drugs and alcohol as well, stating that the melodic, soaring chorus represented the initial substance intoxication, while the jarring guitar riffing in the bridge represented the later jarring comedown. The song has been described as metal music, specifically nu metal.

The song is about Davis working through his own past issues with substance abuse and addiction, something the band's music video also touched on. The video involves Davis, secluded in the lab, going through addiction and withdrawal issues while the band watches, but is unable to interact with him. The video, released on October 26, 2016, was directed by Andrew Baird, who described the music video as:
 The music video was described as looking as if it were something from a grunge band in the 1990s.

Reception
Metal Injection praised it for being the best of the singles from The Serenity of Suffering, describing it as "The riffs are oh-so nu-metal, but there's almost no way you can avoid at least bobbing your head to them. The chorus isn't half bad, but I think the real star of the track are the guitars this time around. Who knew we'd be saying that about Korn in 2016."

Personnel
 Jonathan Davis – lead vocals
 James "Munky" Shaffer – guitars
 Brian "Head" Welch – guitars
 Reginald "Fieldy" Arvizu – bass
 Ray Luzier – drums

Charts

References

2016 songs
Korn songs
Songs written by Jonathan Davis
Songs written by James Shaffer
Songs written by Brian Welch
Songs written by Reginald Arvizu
Roadrunner Records singles
Songs about drugs